Oral Oncology is a monthly peer-reviewed medical journal published by Elsevier covering research about head and neck cancer. It is the official journal of the International Association of Oral Pathologists, the European Association of Oral Medicine, and the International Academy of Oral Oncology.

Abstracting and indexing
The journal is abstracted and indexed in:

According to the Journal Citation Reports, the journal has a 2020 impact factor of 5.337.

References

External links 
 

Oncology journals
English-language journals
Elsevier academic journals
Monthly journals
Publications established in 1965